The 1983 Canadian Club Men's World Open Squash Championship is the men's edition of the 1983 World Open, which serves as the individual world championship for squash players. The event took place in Munich in West Germany from 1 December to 6 December 1983. Jahangir Khan won his third consecutive World Open title, defeating Chris Dittmar in the final.

Seeds

Draw and results

First round

Main draw

Third Place

See also
PSA World Open
1983 Women's World Open Squash Championship

References

External links
World Squash History

M
World Squash Championships
Squash tournaments in Germany
1983 in German sport
International sports competitions hosted by West Germany